Abraham Johannes Stefanus 'Barnie' Boonzaaier (born 19 April 1992 in Pretoria, South Africa) is a South African rugby union player, currently playing with the . He can play as a hooker or a flanker.

Career

Youth

In 2013, his home province  were included in national competitions and Boonzaaier represented the  side in the 2013 Under-21 Provincial Championship, making three appearances as his side finished third in Group B during the regular season to qualify for the semi-final.

Limpopo Blue Bulls

In 2014, Boonzaaier was promoted to the ' senior squad that participated in the 2014 Vodacom Cup competition. He made a total of six starts in the competition as both a hooker and a flanker, but could not prevent Limpopo Blue Bulls losing all their matches in the competition for the second year in succession.

References

South African rugby union players
Living people
1992 births
Rugby union players from Pretoria
Rugby union hookers
Rugby union flankers
Limpopo Blue Bulls players